Dante Barnett (born June 14, 1993) is an American football safety who is currently a free agent. He played college football at Kansas State.

College career
Barnett was awarded the Defensive Most Valuable Player in the 2013 Buffalo Wild Wings Bowl after his performance in Kansas State's 31–14 victory over Michigan. In the game, he recorded a team-high eight tackles and an interception with a 51-yard return to the Michigan seven-yard line.

Professional career
Barnett signed with Denver Broncos as an undrafted free agent on May 13, 2017. He was waived on September 2, 2017.

References

External links
 Kansas State Wildcats bio

1993 births
Living people
Sportspeople from Tulsa, Oklahoma
Players of American football from Oklahoma
Kansas State Wildcats football players
Denver Broncos players